Etruria, aka Tyrrhenia or Tyrsenia, is the land of the Etruscans, a pre-Indo-European people on the Italic peninsula, that was subsumed into the growing Roman Republic.

Etruria may also refer to:

 Etruscan civilization also referred to as Etruria
 Kingdom of Etruria (1801-1807), a former kingdom located in what is now Tuscany.
 King of Etruria, elliptically known as Etruria
 Etruria, Staffordshire, England, UK; a suburb of Stoke-on-Kent
 Etruria Works, Etruria, Staffordshire, England, UK; a ceramics factory that gave its name to the settlement that formed around it in Staffordshire
 Etruria Hall, Etruria, Staffordshire, England, UK; a listed building
 Etruria railway station (1848-2005), Etruria, Staffordshire, England, UK; a former rail station
 Nuova Banca Etruria (New Bank of Etruria), a former Italian bank
  (1884-1908), a trans-Atlantic oceanliner of the Cunard Line
  (1902-1905), a Great Lakes laker freighter
  (1889-1918), a protected cruiser of the Regia Marina
 HMT Etruria; a British Royal Navy trawler, see List of requisitioned trawlers of the Royal Navy (WWII)
 Baronet of Etruria, see Wedgwood baronets

See also

 
 Etrurian (disambiguation)
 Etruscan (disambiguation) aka Etrurian
 Tyrsenian (disambiguation) aka Etrurian
 Tyrrhenian (disambiguation) aka Etrurian
 Tyrrhenia (disambiguation) aka Etruria